Trithemis furva, the Navy dropwing, is a species of dragonfly in the family Libellulidae. It is found in Angola, Cameroon, Chad, Ivory Coast, Equatorial Guinea, Ethiopia, Guinea, Kenya, Liberia, Madagascar, Malawi, Mozambique, Namibia, Nigeria, Sierra Leone, Somalia, South Africa, Sudan, Tanzania, Uganda, Zambia, Zimbabwe, and possibly Burundi. Its natural habitats are subtropical or tropical moist lowland forests, dry savanna, moist savanna, subtropical or tropical dry shrubland, subtropical or tropical moist shrubland, rivers, freshwater marshes, and intermittent freshwater marshes.

Identification
In much of its range, mature males of T. furva are easily confused with those of the similar T. dorsalis. The key difference between the species is the shape of the hamule of the secondary genitalia. Also, in most specimens of T. furva, the outermost antenodal cross-veins do not cross the subcostal vein to join the radial vein, whereas in T. dorsalis they do.

Gallery

References

External links

 Text for navy dropwing from South African Dragonfly Atlas 
 Trithemis furva on African Dragonflies and Damselflies Online

furva
Taxonomy articles created by Polbot
Insects described in 1899